The Tigers of Chowgarh were a pair of man-eating Bengal tigers, consisting of an old tigress and her sub-adult cub, which for over a five-year period killed a reported 64 people in eastern Kumaon over an area spanning . The tigress was attacking humans initially alone, but later she was assisted by her sub-adult cub. The figures however are uncertain, as the natives of the areas the tigers frequented claimed double that number, and they do not take into account victims who survived direct attacks but died subsequently. Both tigers were killed by Jim Corbett.

First victim

On December 15, 1925, a group of men from the village of Dalkania went up a hill to the hut of a Bhutia in order to complain to him for having seemingly allowed his goats into their crop fields. The man’s sheep dog was found dead, and the next day, his remains were found 100 yards (90 metres) from the hut.

Jim Corbett was called upon from Nainital to hunt down the tigers in February 1929. Three man-eaters had been reported in the Kumaon Division at the time, and Corbett chose to hunt the Chowgarh tigers due to their higher body count. A map recording the sites of each kill showed that the tigers were most active in the villages of the north-eastern face of the Kala Agar ridge. Corbett arrived at the Kala Agar Forest Bungalow in April that year after a four-day march. The last victim in the area had been a 22-year-old cattle grazer. The victim’s grandmother offered Corbett three buffaloes, in addition to his four, for use as bait. Upon receiving updates on the tigers' whereabouts, Corbett set off to the village of Dalkania 16 km (10 miles) away the next day. Upon arriving, he was informed that the tigers had unsuccessfully attacked a party of women picking corn 16 km (10 miles) north of Dalkania. Corbett left for the village at 3pm and arrived the next day to find the village in a state of panic.

Hunt for the tigers
At midday, Corbett left for the valley where the villagers had heard the tigers calling. By evening, he reached the upper end of the valley without having seen anything, and by the following afternoon, Corbett was met by a cattle grazer stating that the tigers had taken a cow that night. Tracking the tigers to a ravine, he found the predators eating the dead cow. Corbett fired at the lighter-coloured animal, assuming it was the adult. Upon hearing the shot, the other tiger bolted, and Corbett, upon examining the carcass, found that the dead tiger was in fact the cub. After the cub was shot, the tigress attacks on human became less successful, as she was sometimes unable to kill victims on her own.

First hunt for the tigress
The following day, Corbett decided to use the four buffalo baits. For ten days, there were no reports of attacks and the buffalos were untouched. On the eleventh day, a woman was attacked half a mile (800 m) on the far side of the village. After dressing her wounds, Corbett tied a bait goat on a nearby tree, though it was not taken. Three days later, Corbett was informed that a woman had been killed in Lohali, a village five miles (8 km) to the south of Dalkania. Upon arrival, Corbett was approached by a village elder who implored him to save his daughter who had escaped from the tiger with serious injuries. Though Corbett dressed her wounds with permanganate, she died the following night. After a week, Corbett left Dalkania, though he promised to return upon hearing of another attack. During the journey, Corbett saw fresh pugmarks, and warned a buffalo herder nearby to be wary. Immediately after Corbett left, the herder was attacked by the tigress, which was driven off by the buffaloes. Before dying, the herder warned his village of the tigress’ presence.

Second hunt for the tigress
In February the next year, Corbett returned to Dalkania, where many deaths had occurred since his departure. Corbett tied a buffalo in the forest near the village, and shot two tigers accepting the bait. Upon inspecting the carcasses, he found that neither were the man-eater. After staying in Dalkania for a few weeks, Corbett left to attend an appointment with the district officials in the terai.

Third hunt for the tigress
On 22 March 1930, Corbett received an urgent request from his District Commissioner to go to Kala Agar, fifty miles (80 km) from Nainital. On arrival, Corbett was told that the tigress had recently killed a woman in the vicinity. Corbett tied his four buffaloes from Dalkania in strategic locations, one of which was killed four nights later. The culprits turned out to be a pair of leopards, which were immediately shot in order to prevent them from killing more bait.

Death of the tigress and post-mortem
On 11 April 1930, 19 days after his arrival in Kala Agar, Corbett and two other men tied the buffalo baits near an area where a young man had been previously killed. When positioning himself in a ravine, Corbett’s companions rushed to him, saying they had heard the tigress nearby. Corbett encountered the tigress face to face shortly after. It was sitting next to a large boulder. Corbett fatally shot the animal from a distance of eight feet (5 m), and its death brought an end to the attacks.

The tigress was shot two miles (3.2 km) west of the mountain village of Kala Agar.

An examination of the tigress’ body showed that her claws and one canine tooth were broken and her front teeth were completely worn down. Corbett concluded that these disabilities made it hard for the tiger to kill game, making it resort to humans.

Corbett killed the cub with a .450/400 Nitro Express double rifle made by W.J. Jeffery & Co, and the mother with a lighter Rigby Mauser made on Mauser 98 action by John Rigby & Company. Corbett referred to this rifle as a .275 Rigby, which is the same calibre as a 7×57mm Mauser.

References
“The Chowgargh Tigers”, from The Maneaters of Kumaon in The Jim Corbett Omnibus, Jim Corbett, OUP India, 1991

Chowgarh
Individual tigers in India
1930 animal deaths
Man-eaters of India
Individual wild animals